is a Japanese manga artist, animator, and mecha and character designer. Born in Maizuru, Kyoto Prefecture, he is noted for his work with anime studio Sunrise. He is married to voice actress Maria Kawamura.

Career 
Mamoru Nagano made his professional debut in 1984 working with Yoshiyuki Tomino on the TV series Heavy Metal L-Gaim. Fool for the City, his first manga, came out in 1985 but it was 1986 that brought The Five Star Stories, which is still in production today. Nagano founded Toys Press, Inc. to publish much of his work.

His work in Heavy Metal L-Gaim introducing mecha with armor plates that appeared to fit loosely over an internal skeleton. These detailed and somewhat plausible designs sparked a fresh wave of designs in mecha anime. From there, Nagano went on to design elegant and graceful mecha for his manga The Five Star Stories that displayed elongated lines, delicate curves and a degree of decoration and detail that appealed to the imaginations of a generation of mecha fans. Nagano can be called an innovator in the field of mecha design. He has also contributed to the mecha designs of Zeta Gundam. Among his contributions were the Rick Dias and Hyaku Shiki.

Nagano is also the co-author (along with Kunihiko Ikuhara) and illustrator of Schell Bullet, a novel in two volumes. Later, he has worked on the anime Gothicmade with studio Automatic Flowers as the producer, director, chief writer, character and mechanical designer for the series.

Nagano is a very versatile man and has been a professional artist, manga writer, musician and fashion designer. Some of his art books show him dressed up as Minako Aino from Sailor Moon for cosplay.

Works

Manga
Fool For the City - Story and art
The Five Star Stories – Story and art

Anime
All That Gundam – Mechanical design
Brain Powered – Mecha design
Delpower X Bakuhatsu Miracle Genki! – Character design
The Five Star Stories – Original manga
Giant Gorg – Mechanical Design
Gundam Evolve – Mechanical design
Gothicmade – Director, screenplay, storyboard, original creator, character design, key animation, layout, photography
Heavy Metal L-Gaim – Character design
Mobile Suit Zeta Gundam – Design
Round Vernian Vifam – Mechanical Design

Video games
Tekken 3 – Anna Williams's costume design
Tekken Tag Tournament – Anna Williams's costume design
Tekken 5 – Anna Williams's extra costume design
Tekken 6 – Anna Williams and Asuka Kazama's costume design

References

External links 
Toyspress Mamoru Nagano Lavoratory (bad link: February 14, 2017)

 
 

1960 births
Anime character designers
Japanese animators
Japanese animated film directors
Japanese film directors
Living people
Mechanical designers (mecha)
Manga artists from Kyoto Prefecture
Sunrise (company) people
People from Maizuru